Antaeotricha phaeoneura is a moth in the family Depressariidae. It was described by Edward Meyrick in 1913. It is found in Guyana.

The wingspan is about 29 mm. The forewings are ochreous-white and with all veins marked with fuscous lines. The submedian space is tinged with pale greyish-ochreous, the dorsal space suffused with ochreous-grey. The hindwings are pale grey.

References

Moths described in 1913
phaeoneura
Moths of South America